The Buffseeds were an English indie pop band formed in Exeter, Devon, England, in 1999, consisting of Kieran Scragg on lead vocals and guitar, with Joel Scragg on bass, Ella Lewis on drums and Neil Reed on keyboards. They were active between 1999 and 2004. They are best known for "Sparkle Me", which featured in the ABC series Grey's Anatomy, Season 1, episode 5 - "Shake Your Groove Thing".

They released their one and only album, The Picture Show on 3 March 2003, playing at the Glastonbury Festival that same year.

Lead singer Kieran Scragg and keyboarder Neil Read went on to form Iko.

Discography

Studio albums
The Picture Show (2003)

References

English indie rock groups
British indie pop groups
1999 establishments in England
Musical groups established in 1999